Blanche Kelso Bruce Academy was the name given to several charter schools within the Detroit Public Schools in Detroit, Michigan, serving students in grades 5-12. They functioned as alternative schools for Youth Outside the Educational Mainstream (YOEM). Most of the schools were strict-discipline academies for students who had been expelled from regular schools. The schools were named after Blanche Bruce, the first African American to serve a full term as a United States senator.

Schools which operated under the Blanche Kelso Bruce Academy umbrella included:

Don Bosco - DePaul Youth Treatment Center on 609 E. Grand Blvd., Detroit, MI 48207
Samaritan Center on 5555 Conner St, Detroit, MI 48213
St Jude Center on 15255 Mayfield, Detroit, MI 48205
Victor Center on 1200 Alter Road, Detroit, MI 48215
Wayne County Juvenile Detention Facility on 1326 St. Antoine, Detroit, MI 48226
Wolverine Shelter on 2629 Lenox St., Detroit, MI 48201
BKBA West at 2750 Selden St., Detroit, MI 48208
Catherine Ferguson Academy at 2750 Selden St., Detroit, MI 48208

Blanche Kelso Bruce Academies were chartered through Wayne RESA and are managed by Blair Evans of Evans Solutions.  The Blanche Kelso Bruce Academy School District's central offices were located at 8045 Second Ave., Detroit, MI 48202

In June 2011 the Blanche Kelso Bruce Academy organization was selected to run the Catherine Ferguson Academy for Young Women as a charter school. The academy for pregnant teens and young mothers had been slated for closure for budgetary reasons. Blanche Kelso Bruce Academy also took over operation of the Gladys Barsamian Preparatory Center and the Hancock Center.

On June 6, 2017, the Blanche Kelso Bruce Academy announced their contract with Wayne Regional Educational Service Agency would end at the end of that school year.  At the time of the closing on June 30, 2017, the Academy had been operating the schools:
Wayne County Juvenile Detention Facility on 1326 St. Antoine, Detroit, MI 48226
Bowman House on 17200 Rowe St., Detroit, MI 48205
DePaul Center on 609 E. Grand Blvd., Detroit, MI 48207
Sutton House on 12040 Broadstreet, Detroit, MI 48204

See also
List of public school academy districts in Michigan

References

External links
 

Schools in Detroit
Public high schools in Michigan
Public middle schools in Michigan
Charter schools in Michigan